Alvar Andersson ( – ) was a Swedish politician. He was a member of the Centre Party, and a member of both houses of the bicameral Swedish parliament. He represented Kronoberg County and Halland County in the upper house from 1954 to 1958, and Halland County in the lower house between 1961 and 1964, and again in 1969–1970. When the bicameral parliament had been abolished, he was a member of the unicameral parliament from 1971 to 1979.

Andersson was also active in the Federation of Swedish Farmers, and in the temperance movement IOGT-NTO.

References

Members of the Riksdag from the Centre Party (Sweden)
1913 births
1999 deaths
Members of the Första kammaren
Members of the Andra kammaren
Members of the Riksdag 1970–1973
Members of the Riksdag 1974–1976
Members of the Riksdag 1976–1979
20th-century Swedish politicians